is a Japanese magical girl anime series by Toei Animation. It is the sixteenth installment in the Pretty Cure franchise, and the last series released in the Heisei period. and the sixteenth installment of the franchise, featuring the fourteenth generation of Cures. It is directed by Hiroaki Miyamoto (One Piece Film: Gold) and written by Isao Murayama. The series aired on all ANN stations in Japan from February 3, 2019, to January 26, 2020, succeeding HUG! PreCure in its initial time slot. It was then succeeded by Healin' Good Pretty Cure on February 2, 2020. The series' main topics are imagination and diversity, with outer space, constellations and singing being the Cures' main motifs.

Story
The  is the home to the twelve Star Princesses who are based on the Zodiac signs and maintain order in the universe. But when the Notraiders attack the Star Palace, the princesses scatter themselves across the universe as the Princess Star Color Pens. Receiving a Star Color Pendant and one of the Star Color Pens, Hikaru transforms into the legendary PreCure, Cure Star. Joined by Lala and two other girls, Elena and Madoka, as well as the shapeshifting catlike alien, Yuni, Hikaru leads the Star Twinkle PreCure as they seek to revive the Star Princesses and fight against the Notraiders.

Characters

Star Twinkle Pretty Cures
The titular characters are a team of magical girls who use the rocket ship that Lala came to Earth in to travel through space.

 

The main protagonist. A 13-year-old second year middle school girl who loves stars and constellations. She is cheerful and full of imagination, but also stubborn and often acts on intuition. She enjoys looking at the stars and writing in her notebook, which has turned into the "Twinkle Book." As Cure Star, her main technique is "Star Punch" which can be upgraded into stronger variations by using a Princess Star Color Pen. In the last episode, Hikaru became an astronaut just like she promised Lala. Her theme color is pink.

 

Lala is 13 years old and is the first alien to become a Pretty Cure, Lala is from the planet  who came with Prunce and Fuwa to find the Precure on Earth and ends up becoming one herself. While her presence on Earth is considered illegal according to space laws, she is allowed to remain on Earth under an alias. While serious and responsible, she sometimes makes mistakes while having trouble getting accustomed to Earth's people and customs. As Cure Milky, her main technique is "Milky Shock" which can be upgraded into stronger variations by using a Princess Star Color Pen. In the last episode, Lala became a doctor of the A.I. Her theme color is green.

 

A popular 14-year-old third year middle school student with a radiant smile and athletic prowess, referred to as the "Sun of Mihoshi Town." A hāfu who is Mexican on her father's side, her family own the Sonrisa Flower shop where she works part time while looking after her younger siblings. As Cure Soleil, her main technique is "Soleil Shoot" which can be upgraded into stronger variations by using a Princess Star Color Pen. In the last episode, Elena became a TV language interpreter for media coverage of Hikaru's flight into space. Her theme color is yellow.

 

A 14-year-old third year middle school student who is the student council president of Hikaru's school, referred to as the "Moon of Mihoshi Town". Her father works for the government, and her mother is a pianist. She often strives to be ladylike and is sweet, but can be blunt at times. She is multi-talented in archery, piano, and flower arrangements. As Cure Selene, her main technique is "Selene Arrow" which can be upgraded into stronger variations by using a Princess Star Color Pen. In the last episode, Madoka took her dad's job as a Space Investigator. Her theme color is purple.

 
 
A 17-year-old shapeshifting catgirl from the Planet Rainbow whose people were turned into stone as the result of Aiwarn's experiments. Using a perfume to assist with her shapeshifting, with her ears and tail always remaining, Yuni has searched for a way to restore her people by assuming the identities of phantom thief  to steal stolen treasures, the intergalactic pop idol  to gather information, and Eyeone's butler assistant  to infiltrate the Notraiders. After becoming a Precure, Yuni joins Hikaru and the others to search for the pens with them. As Cure Cosmo, she is armed with the Rainbow Perfume which she uses in her "Cosmo Shining" technique with its "Rainbow Splash" variation using Princess Star Color Pens. In the last episode, Yuni is seen with Olyfio as they watch Hikaru being launched into space. Her theme color is rainbow.

Starry Sky World
 
 
 A baby fairy with the power to create portals through space who was created by the Star Princesses as both a means of reviving them and stopping Ophiuchus, normally residing in the Twinkle Book. After the Star Princess Pens have been gathered, Fuwa is transformed into a unicorn-like fairy with the Pretty Cure told to help her reach her full potential by acquiring their Twinkle Imagination as part of the Star Princesses' plan to destroy Ophiuchus. Despite learning that absorbing the Cures' Twinkle Imagination would ultimately destroy her as well in the process, Fuwa proceeds in the attempt to eliminate Ophiuchus and fails. Fuwa is later revived after the Cures defeated Ophiuchus, but lost her memories and powers. In the last episode, Fuwa now regained her powers and restored her memories before reuniting with the Cures.

 
 
 A UFO-like alien who serves the Star Princesses and came to Earth with Lala to seek the Pretty Cure.

 
 
 The artificial intelligence system of the rocket.

 
 
 An alien from Planet Minitur who assumed a form of a film director so he can test the Pretty Cure's determination to have Lala stay on Earth.

Star Princesses
The  are 13 princesses who protect the balance of the universe, with Ophiuchus originally a member before she turned her back on them when they decided to transfer half of their power to bestow all life in the universe with imagination. The Star Princesses used the rest of their power to create Fuwa and used their remaining strength to drive the Notraiders away, which scatter across the universe as the Princess Star Color Pens sought by the Pretty Cure and the Notraiders. Each princess represents one of the 12 Zodiac signs.

 
 The Star Princess based on Taurus, whose pink Princess Star Color Pen was found on Earth.

 
 The Star Princess based on Leo, whose cyan Princess Star Color Pen was found on Earth.

 The Star Princess based on Libra, whose yellow Princess Star Color Pen with found on Planet Kennel.

 
 The Star Princess based on Capricornus, whose magenta Princess Star Color Pen was in the Notraiders' possession before the Pretty Cure took it.

 
 The Star Princess based on Scorpius, whose orange Princess Star Color Pen was in the Notraiders' possession before the Pretty Cure took it.

 
 The Star Princess based on Sagittarius, whose lilac Princess Star Color Pen was found on Planet Zeni.

 
 The Star Princess based on Virgo, whose white Princess Star Color Pen was found on Planet Zeni.

 
 The Star Princess twin sisters based on Gemini, whose teal Princess Star Color Pen was found on Planet Rainbow.

 
 The Star Princess based on Aries, whose red Princess Star Color Pen was found on Planet Kumarin.

 
 The Star Princess based on Aquarius, whose blue Princess Star Color Pen was found on Planet Icesnow.

 
 The Star Princess based on Cancer, whose green Princess Star Color Pen was found on Planet Saman.

 
 The Star Princess based on Pisces, whose light pink Princess Star Color Pen was found somewhere floating in space.

Notraiders
The , the main antagonists of the series, who originate from the darkest and forgotten parts of the universe, are an intergalactic army of space raiders seeking universal dominion by obtaining all the Princess Star Color Pens to purge the universe of all light and give its power to their leader. Later, they seek to capture Fuwa as a vessel. Their leading members are based on the yokai from Japanese mythology. The name "Notto" means take over (乗っ取る).

Leaders

Leader of the Notraiders and the primary antagonist of the series, Ophiuchus is actually a former member of the Star Princesses who became disillusioned with the universe they created when her fellow princesses voted against her to bestow half of their collective power to all life in the form of imagination. This influenced her to turn on her fellow princesses before they exiled her, eventually regaining her strength and assuming the identity of Darknest, a snake-armored figure with an Uwabami-like serpent wrapped around her body, to consume all light in the universe. But Ophiuchus eventually discards her disguise and minions, capturing Fuwa and the Star Princesses to conduct a ritual to unmake the universe. After surviving the Star Princesses's gambit to destroy her through Fuwa, Ophiuchus is ultimately defeated by the Precures and accepts her loss while vowing to return if things become twisted again.

Second-in command of the Notraiders, he is an oni-like alien who became Darknest's follower after his planet was destroyed with the promise of power. His bracelet can also increase the commanders' powers and has a powerful physical strength to inflict damage on his opponents. During his final battle, he battles the Cures until he learns of Darknest's identity as Ophiuchus and that she destroyed his home planet. Garouoga attempts to kill Ophiuchus before she places him and the commanders under her control by twisting their imagination; the Cures purify them before Aiwarn takes them to safety.

Commanders
Garuouga's subordinates who aid in reviving Darknest, each using different method to battle the Pretty Cures to hinder their mission. Garuouga later increase their powers, with Darknest upgrading their abilities further.

 A kappa-like Commander armed with a lightsaber-like dual blade he uses in his "Kappard Strike" attack, originating from a planet that was destroyed as the result of its naïve people being exploited by other races. This motivated Kappard to believe that peoples from other worlds are incapable of coexisting with each other. While initially seeking to capture Fuwa by any means, he is also a warrior who considers the Pretty Cures as worthy opponents. When empowered by Darknest, his blade can now take peoples' imagination and take the form of other weapons. Given a final chance, he confronts Hikaru by using his own imagination to further power up his weapon and overpowers her first, but the Cures manage to defeat him only for Darknest to teleport him back and absorb him, empowering him. During his final battle, he clashes with the Cures until he discovers Darknest's identity as Ophiuchus; enraged, he attempted to kill her with his allies but she put them under her control by twisting their imagination; the Cures purify them before Aiwarn takes them to safety.

 A playful tengu-like Commander armed with a fan who originated from Planet Guten, joining the Notraiders over her feelings of being an outcast due to her small nose. Tenjou strategizes her attacks on the Pretty Cures, though she is more interested in the Star Princesses' power than capturing Fuwa. She often use Notrei as Human chess pieces to fight the Cures, her upgrade by Darknest allowing her to seal a person inside a Nottorei to enhance grunt via their imagination in size and power. In episode 39, 42 and 43, she has a rivalry with Elena because they have the same past. When she attacks her homeland, Elena understand her feelings and attempt to reconcile with her but she refused. During her final battle, she clashes with the Cures until she discovers Darknest's identity as Ophiuchus; enraged, she attempts to kill her with her allies but she put them under her control by twisting their imagination; the Cures purify them before Aiwarn takes them to safety.

 A bratty Hitotsume-kozō-like Commander armed with a laser pistol who sees others as subjects in her experiments, having petrified the denizens of planet Rainbow to develop the means of corrupting the Princess Star Color Pens into . Aiwarn uses the Dark Pens to create Notriggers from her targets' imaginations, the monsters' strength boosted whenever Aiwarn is enhanced by Darknest. Following the revelation that Bakenyan is one of Yuni's disguises, Aiwarn sought revenge on her for being kicked out of the Notraiders while modifying Yuni's spaceship into her personal transforming robot Aiwarn Robo Unit 16. She makes numerous attempts on Yuni's life until she was stopped from petrifying Planet Uranei's residents, with Yuni apologizing to Aiwarn once realizing she had no home other than with the Notraiders. Aiwarn takes her leave after declining Yuni's offer to live on Earth with her and the other Cures. During the final battle, she aids the Cures against her former allies while returning the favor to Yuni by apologizing back to her about her own reaction.

Grunts

 The foot-soldiers of the Notraiders who are armed with laser blasters. They later become Tenjou's personal monster after receiving powers from Darknest, which she use peoples' imagination to turn them into giant version of Notrei.

 Aiwarn's personal monsters that she creates using a Dark Pen, each Notrigger's form being based on a random object or strong desire from a targeted person's imagination which Aiwarn uses the pen on.

Hoshina family

Hikaru's grandfather, who has strict rules around the house.

Hikaru's mother, who is a mangaka.

Hikaru's grandmother.

 
Hikaru's father, who works overseas studying aliens and other cryptids.

Hikaru's pet dog.

Lala's family

Lala's father, who is an AI Researcher.

Lala's mother, who is a Doctor of Rocket Engineering.

Lala's older twin brother.

Amamiya family 

Elena's father, who is Mexican and the owner of Sonrisa.

Elena's mother, who is Japanese and an interpreter.

Elena's siblings.

Kaguya family

Madoka's stern father who works at the government, perceiving aliens as threat while forbidding his family from keeping secrets.

Madoka's mother, who is a famous pianist.

Yuni's family

The queen of Planet Rainbow.

Others

A dragon-like alien from the planet Zeni.

A hitchhiking hermit crab alien with a yellow bucket on her back from the planet Pururun.

Hikaru and Lala's classmate.

Madoka's classmate.

Madoka's good friend.

 / 

A girl who is the pink-colored Pretty Cure of Flowers from Healin' Good Pretty Cure.

A brown dog-like fairy from Healin' Good Pretty Cure who is the

Film only characters

A chick-like alien from Planet Miracle. He is good at developing Miracle Lights. He was framed by Yango over the malfunction of the factory and seek the Cures to help him clear his name. After Yango's defeat he was appointed as a maker of Miracle Lights.

A manipulative and deceptive crow-like alien from Planet Miracle who serves as the main antagonist in Precure Miracle Universe. Working for the president to end the threat around the universe, he was sent to bring Piton and the Cures in because he believes they are responsible for the disappearance of the Miracle Light. It was revealed that he caused the malfunction of the factory and framed Piton for it. The Cures then help Piton expose his corruption and they gather their feelings to purify him, expelling the darkness inside him. 

An owl-like alien and head of the Planet Miracle.

A star-like alien that sing, but do not speak and labelled as "Star Drop". She befriended the Cures before the alien hunters target her for bounty. When Burn attempts to capture her, she goes berserk and consumes the planet. Hikaru and Lala's song were able to reach her and she disappeared.

A dog-like alien who is a Starry Sky police detective, instructed to arrest Yuni. She can be a little over the top at times. She also makes an appearance in episode 36.

A gang of five alien hunters targeting the UMA, serving as the main antagonists of the movie. They invade Earth to capture UMA to collect a bounty but were confronted by the Cures, the girls were able to defeat them but Burn attempts to capture UMA which caused her to go berserk. After UMA's departure, the hunters are all incarcerated by Mary Anne.

Media

Anime

 Star Twinkle PreCure was announced on November 28, 2018, following a trademark filing reported on October 5, 2018. The series is being directed by Hiroaki Miyamoto and written by Isao Murayama, with character design by Akira Takahashi (Suite PreCure & Doki Doki! PreCure) and music by Yuki Hayashi (Kirakira PreCure a la Mode & Hugtto! PreCure) and Asami Tachibana. The series aired in Japan from February 3, 2019, to January 26, 2020, succeeding the previous series Hugtto! PreCure in its initial timeslot.

Music

Opening

Endings

Insert Songs

Films
The characters appear in the theatrical cross-over film , released on March 16, 2019, alongside characters from Hugtto! PreCure and Kirakira PreCure a la Mode.

An anime film titled  was released on October 19, 2019. Yūta Tanaka is directing the film.

Manga
A manga adaptation illustrated by Futago Kamikita began serialization in Kodansha's Nakayoshi shoujo magazine from February 1, 2019.

Reception
Gadget Tsūshin listed Hikaru's catchphrase in their 2019 anime buzzwords list.

Cosplay marathoner Mitsunobu Saita ran in the 2019 Kobe Marathon as Cure Cosmo.

References

External links
Official website 
Official website (Asahi) 

 

2019 anime television series debuts
Kodansha manga
Magical girl anime and manga
Pretty Cure
Science fiction anime and manga
Japanese children's animated science fantasy television series
Shōjo manga
2019 comics endings
Toei Animation television
TV Asahi original programming
Television series about alien visitations
Extraterrestrial superheroes
Extraterrestrials in anime and manga